Kall is a municipality in the district of Euskirchen in the state of North Rhine-Westphalia, Germany. It is located in the Eifel hills, approximatively 20 km south-west of Euskirchen.

Kall consists of the following districts: Anstois, Benenberg, Diefenbach, Dottel, Frohnrath, Gillenberg, Golbach, Keldenich, Krekel, Rinnen, Roder, Rüth, Scheven, Sistig, Sötenich, Steinfeld, Steinfelderheistert, Straßbüsch, Urft, Wahlen, Wallenthal, Wallenthalerhöhe, and Kall itself.

References

External links

Municipalities in North Rhine-Westphalia
Euskirchen (district)